Indian Head Mountain is a  mountain located in the southeast corner of Greene County, New York. 
The mountain, named for the appearance of its profile, is part of the Devil's Path range of the Catskill Mountains.
To the northwest, Indian Head is separated from Twin Mountain by Jimmy Dolan Notch; to the southeast, Indian Head is flanked by Plattekill Mountain.

Indian Head Mountain stands within the watershed of the Hudson River, which drains into New York Bay. 
The north side of Indian Head drains into the headwaters of Schoharie Creek, thence into the Mohawk River, and the Hudson River. 
The southwest and south sides of Indian Head drain into Saw Kill, thence into Esopus Creek, and the Hudson River. 
The east end of Indian Head is drained by Plattekill Creek in Plattekill Clove, which runs down the Catskill Escarpment, and into Esopus Creek just above Glenerie Falls.

Indian Head Mountain is contained within New York's Catskill State Park.
The mountain is the easternmost summit on the Devil's Path hiking trail.

See also 
 List of mountains in New York

Notes

External links 
 Indian Head Mountain Hiking Info Catskill 3500 Club
 
 
 

Mountains of Greene County, New York
Catskill High Peaks
Mountains of New York (state)